Holbrook Unified School District is a school district based in Holbrook, Arizona, United States. Currently it is one of the highest paying school districts in Navajo County.

Holbrook USD serves the majority of the city of Holbrook and several census-designated places in Navajo County, Arizona: Greasewood, Indian Wells, Sun Valley, Woodruff, and much of Dilkon and Whitecone.

History
In 2013 the district leadership asked voters to approve an "override" of its budget. The measure succeeded, with 419 approving and 371 rejecting, a 53–47% basis.

Schools
 Secondary
 Holbrook High School (Holbrook) - The new George Gardner Performing Arts Center at Holbrook High School is completed.
 Holbrook Junior High School (Holbrook)

 Primary
 Indian Wells Elementary School (K–6) (Unincorporated Navajo County (Indian Wells) - Indian Wells was built to end long daily school bus trips to the city of Holbrook 
 Hulet Elementary School (3–5) (Holbrook)
 Park Elementary School (K–2) (Holbrook)

References

External links
 

Holbrook, Arizona
School districts in Navajo County, Arizona